Harry Nickel McCrory (August 1, 1871 – May 9, 1907) was an American football coach.  He served as the third head football coach
at West Virginia University in Morgantown, West Virginia and he held that position for the 1895 season.  His coaching record at West Virginia was 5–1.

McCrory also served as the head football coach at Ohio Northern University in 1894 while he was attending pharmacy school.

McCrory later worked as a druggist in West Virginia. He married Bessie Lee Nuzum in 1897. He died of bright's disease in 1907. He was buried in Woodlawn Cemetery in Fairmont.

Harry McCrory's grandson, Lee Harland McCrory (son of George Harland McCrory; 1898–1977) was presented with an alumni award from West Virginia University.

Head coaching record

References

External links
 

1871 births
1907 deaths
Ohio Northern Polar Bears football coaches
West Virginia Mountaineers football coaches
University of Pennsylvania alumni
Deaths from nephritis